The Virgin and Child with Saint Stephen, Saint Jerome and Saint Maurice (French: La Vierge à l' Enfant avec saint Étienne, saint Jérôme et saint Maurice), also called the Virgin with Three Saints, is a religious painting by Titian which hangs in the Louvre in Paris.

History 
The Virgin is worshipped by the saints Stephen, Jerome, and George. Gronau thinks this picture may belong to the period about 1508 to 1510. The Louvre dates it to between 1510 and 1525. The type of the Virgin here is like the one in the Madrid Santa Conversazione and the Annunciation, Treviso. Compare the Saint Stephen with the servant's head in the Salome picture of the Doria Gallery. A type like the Saint Jerome is to be found in one of the Padua frescoes. 

The picture entered the Louvre from the collection of Louis XIV.

Gallery

See also 

 Sacra conversazione

References

Sources 

 Gronau, Georg (1904). Titian. London: Duckworth and Co; New York: Charles Scribner's Sons. pp. 282–283.
 Ricketts, Charles (1910). Titian. London: Methuen & Co. Ltd. pp. 50–51, 175, 178, plate xxxi.
 "La Vierge à l' Enfant avec saint Étienne, saint Jérôme et saint Maurice". Louvre. Retrieved 21 November 2022.

Paintings by Titian